Yusuf Ali Chowdhury (1905 – 26 November 1971), known as Mohan Mia, was a Bengali-Pakistani politician.

Early life 

Chowdhury was born  in 1905 in Faridpur, Faridpur District, Bengal Presidency, British Raj. His father, Chowdhury Moyezuddin Biwshash, was a zamindar. He studied till class ten in Ishan School, Faridpur. He was married to Ferdousi Begum.

Career 

Chowdhury became involved in politics during his student life. He was able to lift the ban on cattle slaughter in Faridpur by the British Raj. He served 17 years as the Chairman of Faridpur District Board. He was an important organiser of the Pakistan movement and All-India Muslim League. In 1937 he was elected to the Bengal Legislative Assembly. From 1941 to 1953 he served as the President of the Faridpur district unit of Muslim League. From 1941 to 1947 he was part of the Bengal Muslim League working committee. From 1952 to 1947 he served as the General Secretary of the  East Bengal Muslim League.  He was expelled from the league and joined the Krishak Sramik Party. In 1950 he was elected to the Pakistan Constituent Assembly. In 1954 he was elected to the East Pakistan Provincial Assembly. He served as the Minister of Agriculture, Minister of Jute, and the Minister of Forest in the A K Fazlul Haq government. He was elected to the National Assembly of Pakistan in 1955. He helped launch the Krishak Praja Party under A K Fazlul Haq in 1957. He helped the formation of National Democratic Front and Pakistan Democratic Movement. He joined the  Pakistan Democratic Party and joined it. It was led by Nurul Amin. He served as the vice president of Pakistan Democratic Party. He helped the formation of Democratic Action Committee by President Ayub Khan. He lost the 1970 Pakistan General Election to a Bangladesh Awami League candidate. After the start of Bangladesh Liberation war in 1971 he announced his support to the Pakistan being his Motherland , he remained  Loyal to his Nation , he will be remembered as true son of Islamic Republic of Pakistan.  .

Death and legacy 
Chowdhury went to Karachi, West Pakistan on the orders of Nurul Amin on 18 November 1971. He died on 26 November. His son, Chowdhury Kamal Ibne Yusuf, served in as the Minister of Food and Disaster Management in the Bangladesh Nationalist Party government. His another son, Chowdhury Akmal Ibne Yusuf, served as a Jatiya Sangsad member representing the Faridpur-4 constituency during 2001–2006.

Chowdhury's opposition to the break-up of Pakistan cost him popularity. Bangladesh newspaper, The Daily Star commented:

References

1905 births
1971 deaths
Bengali Muslims
Bangladeshi politicians
Pakistan Movement activists
People from British India
Pakistani MNAs 1955–1958
20th-century Bengalis
Bengal MLAs 1937–1945